Double Whammy is a 1987 novel by Carl Hiaasen.  The protagonist, a private investigator, is hired to expose a celebrity bass fisherman as a cheat and is drawn into a frame-up for murder. The book introduced the character of "Skink" (Clinton Tyree), who becomes a recurring character in Hiaasen's subsequent novels.

Explanation of the Title
The "Double Whammy" is a freshwater fishing lure, supposedly the favorite of the celebrity angler. It is described as 'the hottest lure on the pro bass circuit'.

Plot
One early August morning in Harney County, Florida (the most backward-thinking and racist county in the state), the body of professional bass fisherman Robert Clinch is found floating in Lake Jesup shortly after taking his boat out to go bass fishing. Private investigator R.J. Decker is hired by sugar cane tycoon Dennis Gault, another bass fisherman, to prove that celebrity fisherman Richard "Dickie" Lockhart, his main rival on the fishing tournament circuit, is a cheat. Decker is a former newspaper photographer who was fired and briefly sent to prison after assaulting a teenager who tried to steal his camera equipment.  In Lockhart's hometown of Harney, Decker looks up an old newspaper friend, a laconic reporter named Ott Pickney. Finding the local bass fishing guides too expensive, Decker takes Ott's advice and meets a reclusive hermit who lives in the woods, calling himself "Skink". While teaching Decker about fishing, he mentions seeing Clinch on the lake, but not fishing, on the morning he died. Attending Clinch's funeral, Decker meets Gault's sister Elaine, or "Lanie," who confides to Decker that she and Clinch were lovers. She tells Decker that Gault hired Clinch to catch Lockhart first, only she believes Lockhart had Clinch killed.

Ott is skeptical of Lanie's suspicions, since the coroner ruled Clinch's death an accident and a murder over fishing is too outlandish to be believed. However, when Ott interviews Clinch's widow, he also discovers clues that Clinch wasn't fishing. Tracking down the junked remains of Clinch's boat, Ott discovers signs of sabotage. Unfortunately, at that moment Ott is tracked down and murdered. After finding the body, Decker and Skink are both committed to nailing Lockhart. They tail him to his latest fishing tournament on Louisiana's Lake Maurepas, but inadvertently photograph the wrong gang of cheaters; Lockhart wins the tournament anyway.

Skink tries to raise Decker's spirits, adding, "Worse comes to worst, I'll just shoot the fucker." Later, Decker returns to their hotel room and finds Lanie waiting for him. After the two sleep together and he drops her off at her hotel, Decker notices lights on at the lakeside. He discovers Lockhart floating in the weigh tank, clubbed to death. Assuming Skink is the culprit, Decker drives back to Florida. Upon returning home, he finds the Miami police, led by Detective Al Garcia, waiting for him. Skink intercepts Decker and tells him Gault's whole assignment was a set-up, allowing Gault to kill his hated rival and put the blame on Decker.

The Outdoor Christian Network, led by televangelist Charlie Weeb, organizes a fishing tournament in Lockhart's memory to promote Weeb's housing development at the edge of the Everglades. Weeb is becoming increasingly desperate to boost sales of the condominia, as his network is so financially dependent on the development that its failure will also ruin Weeb himself. He becomes even more desperate when the bass salted into the condo's lakes die, revealing that the land the development is built on lakes' were excavated ater is toxic. Weeb orders his new spokesman, Eddie Spurling, to cheat by harvesting caged bass from the neighboring stretch of clean water in the Everglades.

While trying to escape Miami, Decker and Skink are stopped by Garcia, who has already found holes in Gault's frame-up story and is more than ready to believe Decker's version of events. Meanwhile, a worried Gault sends his hired thug, Thomas Curl, to kill Decker before Garcia finds him. While researching Lockhart's history, Decker and Skink learn of the housing development, and Skink is determined to stop it by sabotaging the fishing tournament. 

With the help of Skink's friend, State Trooper Jim Tile, Decker tracks down Lanie and forces her to confess to helping her brother frame Decker for Lockhart's murder. Lanie admits that she became involved with Decker at Gault's suggestion, to help punish Lockhart for Clinch's murder. After Lockhart was killed, Gault convinced her to falsely tell police that Decker was on his way to see Lockhart when she last saw him. Although Lanie's recorded statement is enough to clear Decker's name, Curl kidnaps Decker's ex-wife Catherine and demands that Decker trade his life for hers. Decker tells Skink to go ahead with his plan to sabotage the tournament while he deals with Curl himself.

Skink's original plan is to have Garcia and Tile enter the tournament, posing as brothers, and win by catching Skink's gargantuan Queenie. With publicity for Weeb's development aimed exclusively at white people, Skink predicts that having an African-American and a Cuban win the tournament will be fatal for sales. However, at the last moment, Skink changes his plan and arranges a "confrontation" between Queenie and Gault. He anonymously tips off Gault as to the location where he will plant Queenie, while sabotaging the motor of Garcia and Tile's boat. Decker rescues Catherine and kills Curl with a booby-trapped camera. 

Predictably, the tournament is a fiasco: the latest batch of fish are so sickened by the toxic water that they refuse to eat, while Garcia and Tile are the only participants to catch one (tiny) bass. Spurling refuses to cheat, forcing Weeb to name them the winners and admit that the promised $250,000 grand prize is "not available." Garcia and Tile reveal their badges and arrest Weeb for fraud on live television. Skink sees all the bass floating to the surface and realizes he has put Queenie in mortal danger by slipping her into the toxic water. Decker and Catherine join him on a boat borrowed from Spurling, and they speed to where he put her into the water.

They come upon Gault's boat, where Lanie is sitting alone and Gault's dead body is floating in the water. Gault succeeded in hooking Queenie, but was unprepared for her weight and power, and so tried to use his boat's engine to exhaust her. When she unexpectedly changed direction, Gault was unwilling to let her go, and was pulled overboard onto his own boat's propeller. Skink dives into the water, pulls a barely-alive Queenie out and leaps across a levee to put her in the Everglades. Decker and Catherine, following onto the levee, cannot see either of them, but are sure they hear the sound of both swimming to safety.

Banning 
In 2017, the Texas Department of Corrections included Double Whammy on its list of banned books which inmates of the state prisons were not allowed to read.  Hiaasen remarked that he was "flattered", although at a loss to understand how the book could spark a prisoner uprising.

Connections with Hiaasen's other works
Detective Al Garcia reappears, after his introduction in Tourist Season.  A joking reference to his "victory" in the bass fishing tournament is made in the subsequent novel Skin Tight.
Clinton Tyree, aka "Skink," becomes a recurring character, along with FHP Trooper Jim Tile.
Hiaasen's novels often feature a recurring joke that radiology is a "soft" medical discipline, and those that practice it are not "real" doctors.  In this novel, the pathologist who conducts a hurried autopsy on Robert Clinch's body reflects internally that sometimes he wishes he had gone into radiology "like his dumb cousin."
As governor, Tyree was disheartened to learn that his own running mate, the lieutenant governor, was a principal shareholder in a development company that acquired the wildlife preserve Tyree was trying to save.  The lieutenant governor is not named, and does not appear, until Hiaasen's 2010 novel Star Island.

Allusions to actual history, geography, or persons
Decker's father was an F.B.I. agent stationed in Dallas, Texas, when John F. Kennedy was assassinated.  Decker's passion for photography was first kindled when he saw the Zapruder film as a young child.
When Skink resigned from office, he purchased a bus ticket out of Tallahassee using the alias "Black Leclere," the name of one of the two main characters of Jack London's short story Bâtard.
Several references are made to the largest largemouth bass ever caught, by George W. Perry in Georgia in 1932, which weighed 22 lbs. 4 oz.  This record was unrivaled until 2009, when Japanese fisherman Manabu Kurita caught a bass of equal weight.

See also

 Roadkill cuisine

References

External links
 

1987 American novels
Novels by Carl Hiaasen
Environmental fiction books
Novels set in Florida